Sunder Lal ( – 3 January 1987) was an Indian independence activist and politician. A member of the Indian National Congress, he served as a Member of Lok Sabha six times. For the first 5 Lok Sabha elections, Lal represented the Saharanpur constituency of Uttar Pradesh.

Early life and education
Lal was born in village Baliakheri, Saharanpur district in the state of Uttar Pradesh. He participated in the Indian independence movement and after Indian independence he joined active politics.

Political career
Lal was Member of Parliament for five straight terms (1952-1977) from Saharanpur, and after losing from Haridwar in 1977, won that seat in 1984. During the 1st Lok Sabha, Saharanpur constituency was differently defined. Lal represented the "Saharanpur (West) cum Muzaffarnagar (North)" constituency during the 1st Lok Sabha. He was a member of a Congress party. And was supposed to be close to Indira Gandhi and Hemvati Nandan Bahuguna.

Posts held

See also
1st, 2nd, 3rd, 4th & 5th Lok Sabha
Government of India
Indian National Congress
Lists of members of the Lok Sabha of India
Lok Sabha
Parliament of India
Politics of India
Saharanpur (Lok Sabha constituency)

References 

1920s births
Year of birth uncertain
1987 deaths
India MPs 1952–1957
India MPs 1957–1962
India MPs 1962–1967
India MPs 1967–1970
India MPs 1971–1977
Indian National Congress politicians
Lok Sabha members from Uttar Pradesh
People from Saharanpur
People from Saharanpur district
India MPs 1984–1989
People from Muzaffarnagar district
People from Haridwar district